Apuzzo is an Italian surname. Notable people with the surname include:

Matt Apuzzo (born 1978), American journalist
Michael L. J. Apuzzo (born 1940), American neurological surgeon
Virginia Apuzzo (born 1941), American LGBT rights and AIDS activist

See also
D'Apuzzo

Italian-language surnames